Dannevirke is an unincorporated community in Howard County, Nebraska, United States.

History
A post office was established at Dannevirke in the 1880s. A majority of the early settlers being natives of Denmark caused the name of Dannevirke, for the old Danish fortification, to be selected.

References

Danish-American culture in Nebraska
Unincorporated communities in Howard County, Nebraska
Unincorporated communities in Nebraska